Commonwealth Day is an annual commemoration of the Commonwealth of Nations.

Commonwealth Day may also refer to:
 Commonwealth Day, a public holiday in Puerto Rico on 25 July
 Commonwealth Day, Northern Mariana Islands' national day on 8 January